Tai Hara (born 29 March 1990) is an Australian actor, presenter and filmmaker.

Early life and career
Hara was born in Sydney. He attended The Southport School on the Gold Coast, Queensland. before attending Queensland University of Technology where he graduated with a Bachelor of Fine Arts (Acting) in 2010. Following his graduation, Hara presented the television show Cash Call, which he hosted for two seasons.

Hara made his screen debut in 2011, appearing in a small role in a short-lived American science fiction drama Terra Nova. Hara is best known for his role on the Seven Network soap opera Home and Away, as Andy Barrett, from 2013 (the series' twenty-sixth season) until 2016. Hara has since appeared in Australian Crime Drama Hyde and Seek and popular US series Madam Secretary and Preacher.

In 2014, Hara competed in the 14th series of Dancing with the Stars.

He created a web-series in 2020 called Colour Blind, a mockumentary about casting agents.

Personal life
Hara became engaged to Hi-5 cast member, Fely Irvine in 2015, and the couple married in Bali in 2017. Their first child, a daughter, was born in late 2020.

Filmography

References

External links

1990 births
Australian male film actors
Australian male soap opera actors
21st-century Australian male actors
Male actors from Sydney
Living people